Mysterious may refer to:

 Mysterious (album), a 1988 album by Shizuka Kudō
 "Mysterious" (song), a 2005 song by Jentina
 "Mysterious", a song by Scorpions from the 1999 album Eye II Eye
 Mysterious Walker (1884-1958), American baseball player
 Mysterious (horse) (1970–1988), thoroughbred racehorse

See also
 Mystery (disambiguation)